Nau Gad Khola Hydropower Station (Nepali: नाउगड जलविद्युत आयोजना) is a run-of-river hydro-electric plant located in   Darchula District of Nepal. The flow from Naugad River is used to generate 8.5 MW electricity. The plant is owned and developed by Api Power Company Pvt. Ltd, an IPP of Nepal. The plant started generating electricity from 2072-05-02BS. The generation licence will expire in 2104-03-30 BS, after which the plant will be handed over to the government.  The power station is connected to the national grid and the electricity is sold to Nepal Electricity Authority.

See also

List of power stations in Nepal

References

Hydroelectric power stations in Nepal
Gravity dams
Run-of-the-river power stations
Dams in Nepal
Irrigation in Nepal
Buildings and structures in Darchula District